This article is about the 2008 season of the Widnes Vikings This was their first season since being purchased by Cheshire millionaire after the club went into administration following their loss to Castleford Tigers in the 2007 National League One final.

Championship Table

Classification: 1st on competition points; 2nd on match points difference.
Competition points: For win = 3; For draw = 2; For loss by 12 points or fewer = 1.

Notes: Widnes deducted 9 Points for going into administration

League results

Northern Rail Cup Results

Challenge Cup Results

Players

References

Widnes Vikings seasons
2008 in rugby league by club
2008 in English rugby league